Yuhuatai Memorial Park of Revolutionary Martyrs (雨花台烈士陵园) is a park and tourist site in the Yuhuatai District of Nanjing, Jiangsu Province, China. The name Yuhuatai comes from yu (rain), hua (flower), tai (platform). A prominent feature of the park is a statue of nine figures. The statue commemorates the 100,000 Communists killed by the Kuomintang.

References

Parks in Nanjing
Cemeteries in Nanjing
Major National Historical and Cultural Sites in Jiangsu